David Alexidze is a Georgian artist. His art can most precisely be described as mystic realism. His works are introduced in many catalogues and preserved in various private collections. He is the Dean of the Faculty of Visual arts of Tbilisi State Academy of Arts.

Education 

Georgian art went through the complicated process of changes in 1990s, preceded by the decade which had formed and evolved new trends. The end of the Soviet era ( Revolutions of 1989 ) had severe impact on the country itself, followed by collapse of the fundamentals, the Georgian Civil War, notion of the upcoming disasters, hopelessness - nothing horizontal or vertical and as a result - amorphous visual expression in the Georgian cultural narrative. This was when artist David Alexidze first shared his art works with the public. It did not take him much effort to get established within the then active Georgian artistic society, where he found his place right after graduation from Tbilisi State Academy of Arts, Nikoloz (Koka) Ignatov ’s Workshop, 1988-1991. He was a prodigy in arts, having created in his early years a sophisticated artistic system through active philosophical and critical thinking.

Artwork 

In general four trends can be identified in Davit Alexidze’s art: graphical works on black background, figurative paintings on black background (times on textured surface) of elongated vertical or horizontal picture planes, yellow series and black-and-white abstract arts. Alexidze’s art is being created in late 20th and early 21st century. It is a collection of real senses, which regardless the richness of colors, is quite dark, although the audience does not get lost in this gloom; and this is a kind of a game or an idea on gaming, which is bright new to Georgian art.

References 

 კაჭარავა, კარლო. (16 ოქტომბერი, 1992) „დავით ალექსიძის გამოფენა და ბესტიარიუმი“. გაზეთი „დრონი“ 
 ხაბულიანი, ხათუნა. (მაისი, 2001) „პარაზიტოფორმე“, თევზები და სხვა". გაზეთი „ალტერნატივა“
 გაბუნია, ალექსანდრა. (2016) "დავით ალექსიძე". Gabunia, Alexandra. "David Alexidze". pp. 5–17. Tbilisi /

External links 
 Georgian Art Portal
 Tbilisi State Academy of Arts - Faculty of Visual Arts
  David Alexidze catalogue

Painters from Georgia (country)
Artists from Tbilisi
Tbilisi State Academy of Arts alumni
1966 births
Living people